Hindsiothrips is a genus of thrips in the family Phlaeothripidae.

Species
 Hindsiothrips bonessi
 Hindsiothrips navarrensis
 Hindsiothrips oettingeni
 Hindsiothrips pullatus
 Hindsiothrips robustisetis
 Hindsiothrips sisakhti

References

Phlaeothripidae
Thrips
Thrips genera